"Wyclef Jean" is a single by American rapper Young Thug. It was included on his mixtape Jeffery and was released as the second single from the tape on January 24, 2017. The song is named after Haitian rapper Wyclef Jean, who is best known for being part of the Fugees.

The song peaked at number 87 on the Billboard Hot 100, and is best known for its music video, which was released on January 16, 2017. Young Thug never showed up for the shooting of the video, and it subsequently went viral as a result.

Music video 
The music video for the track was released on January 16, 2017, and was directed by Pomp&Clout. Young Thug was not present in the video aside from one scene, due to him not showing up. His representatives later confirmed to Pitchfork that Thug "gave his input and creative direction for the concept and theme".

The video won an MTV Video Music Award for Best Editing in 2017, much to Young Thug's confusion, who tweeted that he did not know he had won an award.

Critical reception 
Mitch Findlay of HotNewHipHop reviewed the track on its third anniversary, and called it "a shining point in Thug's discography".

Awards and nominations

Charts

Certifications

References 

2016 singles
2016 songs
Young Thug songs
Songs written by Young Thug